The Fort Maguire aulonocara (Aulonocara hansbaenschi), also known as Aulonocara 'Fort Maguire' in the aquarium fish trade, is a species of haplochromine cichlid endemic to Lake Malawi.

It is found in Malawi and Mozambique. Its natural habitat is freshwater lakes. This species is treated as junior synonym of Aulonocara stuartgranti by the IUCN and the Catalog of Fishes, but FishBase treat it as a valid species.

References

hansbaenschi
Taxa named by Manfred K. Meyer
Taxa named by Rüdiger Riehl
Taxa named by Horst Zetzsche
Fish described in 1987
Taxonomy articles created by Polbot
Taxobox binomials not recognized by IUCN